The Grambling State Tigers baseball team is a varsity intercollegiate athletic team of Grambling State University in Grambling, Louisiana, U.S. The team is a member of the Southwestern Athletic Conference, which is part of the National Collegiate Athletic Association's Division I. The team plays its home games at Wilbert Ellis Field at Ralph Waldo Emerson Jones Park in Grambling, Louisiana. The Tigers are coached by Davin Pierre.

The program was founded by Ralph Waldo Emerson Jones, who served as the team's first head coach.

Major League Baseball
Grambling State has had 50 Major League Baseball Draft selections since the draft began in 1965.

See also
List of NCAA Division I baseball programs

References

External links

 
Baseball teams established in 1936
1936 establishments in Louisiana